Stallion Road is a 1947 American Drama Western film directed by James V. Kern, written by Stephen Longstreet, and starring Ronald Reagan, Alexis Smith, Zachary Scott, Peggy Knudsen, Patti Brady and Harry Davenport. It was released by Warner Bros. on April 12, 1947.

Plot
Based on the novel and screenplay by Stephen Longstreet,  this film depicts the romance which flowers between a breezy young veterinarian (Ronald Reagan), and a lady who runs a breeding farm (Alexis Smith). The two horse-loving characters appear to be bound for an inevitable love story. And a friend of the vet (Zachary Scott), who also fancies the lady, quite obviously hasn't a chance.
But then, in a moment of crisis, when the favourite mare of the lady is at death's door, the vet doesn't respond to her summons. He is off vaccinating a herd of cows which is suddenly and alarmingly threatened with the dreaded anthrax disease. And that, it seems, is an incident which the lady takes very personally: she gives the vet the cold shoulder and throws herself into the arms of his pal.
Eventually, things come around when the vet contracts anthrax himself (after pulling the lady's herd of horses out of danger with a new serum he has found) and she realizes that she still loves him and that she has to save him at all costs. So, she gives him the anthrax serum, and luckily he pulls through.

Cast 
Ronald Reagan as Larry Hanrahan
Alexis Smith as Rory Teller
Zachary Scott as Stephen Purcell
Peggy Knudsen as Daisy Otis
Patti Brady as Chris Teller
Harry Davenport as Dr. Stevens
Angela Greene as Lana Rock
Frank Puglia as Pelon
Ralph Byrd as Richmond Mallard
Lloyd Corrigan as Ben Otis
Fernando Alvarado as Chico
Matthew Boulton as Joe Beasley
Creighton Hale as Party Guest (uncredited)
Jack Mower as Jack (uncredited)

Production
The story was originally bought as a vehicle for Alan Ladd.

References

External links
 
 

1947 romantic drama films
1947 films
American black-and-white films
Warner Bros. films
American romantic drama films
American Western (genre) films
1947 Western (genre) films
Films directed by James V. Kern
Films scored by Friedrich Hollaender
1940s English-language films
1940s American films